Ratan Chakraborty is an Indian politician and Member of Tripura Legislative Assembly from Khayerpur Assembly constituency who is serving as Speaker of Tripura Legislative Assembly.

Personal life 
He was born on 17 July 1951 in Agartala, Tripura. He is married to Sharmila Debbarma and they have three daughters.

References 

People from Agartala
Speakers of the Tripura Legislative Assembly
Tripura MLAs 2018–2023
Tripura MLAs 2023–2028
Bharatiya Janata Party politicians from Tripura